Supernumerary chromosome could refer to:

 B chromosome in some animals and plants
 Small supernumerary marker chromosome (sSMC) in humans